No Limit Forever Records is an American independent record label founded by Romeo Miller. No Limit's Vice President is Romeo's brother Valentino. No Limit's COO is Romeo's uncle Silkk The Shocker.

History
On November 26, 2010,  No Limit Forever Records was established by Romeo Miller.

On February 9, 2011 Romeo Miller signed the first female to the label, Miss Chee. He also signed rapper Oak Tree and Jamaican singer Kay-I. The next day, Romeo signed Terry "T-Million" Miles to the label and on February 16, 2011 it was announced that he had signed SouthDown, the first rock band to be on the label. Romeo has also signed Louisiana artist Co-Ruff and former Death Row Records artist Eastwood

On November 17, 2012 Master P formed a group called Louie V Mob that features himself, Atlanta rapper Alley Boy & Washington, DC rapper Fat Trel.

In 2015, Master P formed a new group called Money Mafia which originally featured himself & No Limit Forever artists Ace B, Calliope Popeye, Eastwood, Flight Boy, Gangsta, Maserati Rome, Play Beezy, & No Limit Forever in-house producer BlaqNmilD, Money Mafia now consist of original members Ace B, BlaqNmilD, Eastwood, Master P & newest members Dark Fame formerly Fame-O, Maine Musik, Miss Chee & T.E.C.  On December 9, 2015 it was announced that Master P had signed Arizona artist's Angelo Nano & JSlugg500.

On March 28, 2016 Master P would introduce his group No Limit Boys formerly Money Mafia which now consist of No Limit Forever artists Ace B, Angelo Nano, BlaqNmilD, JSlugg500, Lambo, Master P & Mo3Roy. On December 14, 2016 Master P would announce the signing of Houston, Texas artist Marqus Clae.

On January 25, 2017 Master P would announce the signing of Long Beach, California artist Paloma Ford.

2011–present: Mixtapes
On June 14, 2011 Bengie B & Gangsta released a collaboration mixtape titled Bgs Vol 1. On June 18, 2011 T-Bo Da Firecracker released a mixtape titled Jimi Swag. On July 29, 2011 Black Don released a mixtape titled The Scrimmage. On August 19, 2011 Romeo released a mixtape titled I Am No Limit. On November 16, 2011 Master P released his debut mixtape titled TMZ (Too Many Zeroes).

On August 19, 2012 Romeo released a mixtape titled Inception. On August 21, 2012 Bengie B released a mixtape titled Ben Raw, Ben Real. On September 21, 2012 T.E.C. released a mixtape titled The Take Off. On October 19, 2011 T-Bo Da Firecracker released a mixtape titled White Boi Swag. On December 31, 2012 Pallo Da Jiint released a mixtape titled Dat Heat Rock.

On January 16, 2013 Master P released a mixtape titled Al Capone which was a promo for his upcoming Boss of All Bosses album. On February 12, 2013 Master P with his newly founded group Louie V Mob released a collaboration mixtape titled New World Order. Master P's next mixtape Famous Again was released on August 6, 2013. Both mixtapes were #1 in selling and digital downloads. On June 25, 2013 Cymphonique released her debut mixtape titled Passion. On November 1, 2013 Miss Chee released her debut mixtape titled Jacking For Ransom which was very successful.

On February 28, 2014 Master P released a mixtape titled The Gift Vol. 1: Return of The Ice Cream Man. On September 4, 2014 Miss Chee released a mixtape titled Flatline.

In 2015, Master P formed a new group called Money Mafia, on January 5, 2015 they released a mixtape titled We All We Got. On February 9, 2015 Master P released a collaboration mixtape titled #CP3 with his No Limit Forever artist & fellow New Orleans rapper Ace B. On April 20, 2015 Money Mafia released their second mixtape titled Hustlin. On July 13, 2015 No Limit Forever artist/in-house producer BlaqNmilD released his mixtape titled The Becoming.
On July 16, 2015 Money Mafia released their third mixtape titled The Luciano Family. On July 28, 2015 No Limit Forever artist She Money released her mixtape titled Colombiana. On August 14, 2015 No Limit Forever artist Eastwood released his mixtape titled Mr. Black Bandana: Trapper Of The Year. On September 14, 2015 No Limit Forever artist Flight Boy released his mixtape titled Skyy High. On September 18, 2015 No Limit Forever artist Ace B released his mixtape titled Ace Of Hearts.

On January 7, 2016 No Limit Forever artist Maserati Rome would release his mixtape entitled Fighting Monsters. On January 29, 2016 No Limit Forever artist/in-house producer BlaqNmilD would release his mixtape titled Money & War. On March 16, 2016 Master P would release his mixtape entitled Middle Finga. On March 30, 2016 No Limit Forever artist Flight Boy released his mixtape titled Behind Enemy Lines. On August 21, 2016 Master P released a mixtape titled The G Mixtape. On October 4, 2016 No Limit Forever artist MoeRoy released his mixtape titled Trap MJ (Michael Jackson). on January 9, 2017 No Limit Forever artist Marqus Clae released his mixtape titled The Ghetto Poet. On October 27, 2016 Master P released a mixtape titled Louisiana Hot Sauce.

On January 6, 2017 No Limit Forever newest group No Limit Boys formerly Money Mafia released their mixtape entitled We All We Got. On February 6, 2017 No Limit Forever artist Ace B released his mixtape titled Ace Of Spades. On February 11, 2017 No Limit Forever would release their mixtape entitled No Limit Takeover.

2013–present: Albums
On December 6, 2013 Master P released his thirteenth album titled The Gift which is the label's first album release.

On June 4, 2015 it was announced that No Limit Forever newest group Money Mafia would be releasing their debut album in 2015 titled Rarri Boys. On June 8, 2015 Money Mafia would release their first single from Rarri Boys titled "Bonita". On July 29, 2015 Maserati Rome would release two new singles from his upcoming fourth studio album titled "Till the Club Close" featuring fellow No Limit Forever artist Ace B & "Bent" featuring fellow No Limit Forever artist's Ace B & his uncle Silkk the Shocker. On September 4, 2015 Silkk The Shocker would release a new single from his upcoming sixth studio album Incredible titled "Business" featuring fellow No Limit Forever artist/producer BlaqNmilD. On October 7, 2015 Master P would reveal the cover art's & announced that there would be three sequel album installments to his critically acclaimed debut major label album Ice Cream Man titled Ice Cream Man 2: The Streets, Ice Cream Man 3: The Hustle, Ice Cream Man 4: The Lifestyle that will be released all on the same day. On October 13, 2015 Master P would reveal & announced the cover art, release date & track list to his upcoming new album titled Empire that will be released on November 28, 2015. On November 27, 2015 Master P released his fourteenth album titled Empire, from the Hood to Hollywood which is the label's second album release.

On March 28, 2016 it was announced that No Limit Forever newest group No Limit Boys formerly Money Mafia would be releasing their debut album in 2016 titled No Limit Boys & it was announced that No Limit Forever CEO Master P would be releasing his new album entitled The Grind Don't Stop.

No Limit Forever LLC is currently suspended by the California Franchise Tax Board; it had no agent for service of process since 2014.

Artists

Current artists

Ace B (No Limit Forever)
 Angelo Nano (No Limit Forever, Power Circle)
 BlaqNmilD (No Limit Forever, Musical Geniuses)
 Calliope Popeye (No Limit Forever)
 Choppa (No Limit Forever, I Represent)
 C-Murder  (No Limit Forever)(TRU Records)
 Co-Ruff (No Limit Forever)
 Cymphonique (No Limit Forever, Flush)
 Dirty B (No Limit Forever)
 Flight Boy (No Limit Forever, Flight Boy Forever)
 Gangsta (No Limit Forever, Listen)
 G5-J (No Limit Forever, Shocker World)
 Hitmayne4Hire (No Limit Forever)
 JSlugg500 (No Limit Forever)
 Kay-I (No Limit Forever)
 King Roy (No Limit Forever)
 Krazy (No Limit Forever, Breather)
 Lambo (No Limit Forever)
 Lime Team (No Limit Forever)
 Marqus Clae (No Limit Forever)
 Maserati Rome
 Master P 
 MoeRoy (No Limit Forever, No Mistakes)
 No Limit Boys (No Limit Forever)
 Paloma Ford (No Limit Forever)
 Play Beezy (No Limit Forever, Lurkin Music)
 Sam I Am (No Limit Forever, Flight Boy Forever)
Rickadon (No Limit Forever, Rickaveli)
 Silkk the Shocker (No Limit Forever, Shocker World)
 Young Vee (No Limit Forever)

In-house producers
 1500 or Nothin' (affiliate)
 BlaqNmilD
 Deezle (affiliate)
 JBuc The Producer (affiliate)
 JSlugg500
 King Tru3
 Mike Nef
 The Composer (affiliate)
 Young Bugatti

Former artists

 Ace High
 Bengie B
 Black Don 
 Catalina Toma
 D The Business
 Dark Fame
 Eastwood 
 Louie V. Mob
 Alley Boy
 Fat Trel
 Luccianos
 Maine Musik
 T.E.C.
 Miss Chee
 Montana8400
 OakTree
 Pallo Da Giant
 She Money
 SouthDown
 Suave
 Suni Blac
 T-Bo Da Firecracker
 Young Junne

Managed Acts

Publishing
 Cymphonique Miller
 Fabulous Girls
 Lil King
 Veno

Full discography

See also
List of record labels
No Limit Records
No Limit Records discography
List of No Limit Records artists

References

American record labels
Record labels established in 2010
Hip hop record labels